Rahmatabad-e Kuchak (also Romanized as Raḩmatābād-e Kūchak; also known as Raḩmatābād) is a village in Dashtabi-ye Sharqi Rural District, Dashtabi District, Buin Zahra County, Qazvin Province, Iran. At the 2006 census, its population was 118, in 29 families.

References 

Populated places in Buin Zahra County